Luis Reyes Peñaranda ( – ?)  was a Bolivian football defender.

Career 
He was member of the Bolivia national team at the 1930 FIFA World Cup.

References

External links

1911 births
Association football defenders
Bolivian footballers
Bolivia international footballers
1930 FIFA World Cup players
Year of death missing